Arnold Green may refer to:
Arnold Green (politician) (1920–2011), Estonian Soviet politician and Olympic organizer
Arnold Green (rugby league) (1930s–2016), New Zealand rugby league international
Arnold H. Green (1940–2019), BYU professor and historian who specializes in Tunisia